Mansa railway station is located in Mansa district in the Indian state of Punjab and serves Mansa city which is the administrative headquarter of the district. Its station code is MSZ. Mansa station falls under Delhi railway division of Northern Railway zone of Indian Railways.

The railway station 
This station is located on the double track,  broad gauge, Jakhal–Bathinda section of Delhi–Fazilka line.

Electrification 
Mansa railway station is situated on double track electrified line. There are three electrified tracks at the station.

Amenities 
Mansa railway station has one booking window, no enquiry office and all basic amenities like drinking water, public toilets, sheltered area with adequate seating. There are two platforms at the station and one foot overbridge (FOB). Another foot overbridge across railway tracks of station provides pedestrian connectivity between residential areas.

References

External links 

 Pictures of Mansa railway station

Railway stations in Mansa district
Delhi railway division
Mansa district, India